Dillon Freasier (born March 6, 1996) is an American former actor. His only film role was in the 2007 film There Will Be Blood.

Career
Freasier was not an actor when chosen for his role in There Will Be Blood. After several failed attempts of casting other actors, Cassandra Kulukundis searched for potential actors in rural schools near Marfa, Texas, the film's primary filming location. At the Fort Davis school with "maybe eight boys of the right age", Freasier was singled out by his principal. Kulukundis said that "he just stayed in my mind, so I called his mother at home and asked if it was all right if I could come over that night". While racing to another school to see more boys, Kulukundis was pulled over by a traffic cop, who happened to be Freasier's mother, and was let off with a warning.

According to The New York Times, Paul Thomas Anderson "really wanted a kid who'd grown up around ranches and horses rather than someone coming in and trying to fake that". In an interview, Daniel Day-Lewis told the story of what happened when Freasier's mother researched his past roles in an attempt to understand who her son would be working with: "She thought she better check out this bunch of people taking care of her son. So she got Gangs of New York. Absolutely appalled! She thought she was releasing her dear child to this monster. And so there was a flurry of phone calls and somebody sent a copy of The Age of Innocence."

In the Los Angeles Times, Day-Lewis spoke about his concerns of how Freasier would react to the more serious scenes: "I started to worry a little bit because we were very close, and I thought, 'Man, how's he going to feel when I start treating him harshly?' So I kind of sat him down. I created this sort of atmosphere... portentous atmosphere. 'Dillon, you know how I feel about you and there are going to be moments... I'm not going to treat you nicely. I want you to understand that I love you.' He looked at me like I was insane."

Christy Lemire, the film critic for the Associated Press, praised Freasier as a "confident newcomer", and the Los Angeles Times labeled him "a budding star". In a film review published in Christianity Today, political philosopher Jean Bethke Elshtain called Freasier's performance "astonishing". During his Academy Award acceptance speech for Best Actor, Day-Lewis said "I wish my son and my partner H.W. Plainview were up here with me, the mighty Dillon Freasier". Freasier, who had decided to skip the Oscars, was asleep at the time. He was nominated for a Young Artist Award in 2007 for his role in the film.

Freasier has stated that he is unsure about his career. As of December 2017, he has not pursued any more roles.

Personal life
In January 2007, with his mother and two sisters, Freasier moved to Albany, Texas, where he attended Albany High School and played football. A rodeo enthusiast, he competed in horse roping and won numerous medals for ranching skills.

Filmography

References

External links

American male film actors
Male actors from Texas
American male child actors
1996 births
Living people
21st-century American male actors
People from Jeff Davis County, Texas